The 2020 United States presidential election in New Mexico was held on Tuesday, November 3, 2020, as part of the 2020 United States presidential election in which all 50 states plus the District of Columbia participated. New Mexico voters chose electors to represent them in the Electoral College via a popular vote, pitting the Republican Party's nominee, incumbent President Donald Trump, and running mate Vice President Mike Pence against Democratic Party nominee, former Vice President Joe Biden, and his running mate California Senator Kamala Harris. New Mexico has five electoral votes in the Electoral College.

New Mexico was won by Biden by a 10.79% margin of victory. Prior to the election, most news organizations making election predictions considered New Mexico as a state Biden would win, or a safe blue state. The state used to be quite competitive, voting for Democrat Al Gore in 2000 with a margin of only 366 votes and Republican George W. Bush in 2004 by 5,988 votes. However, the Land of Enchantment has become a reliably blue state since then as Democrats have relied on Hispanic, Native American, and urban voters to deliver victories. Biden scored victories in all of the state's three largest counties: Bernalillo, Doña Ana, and Santa Fe counties, home to Albuquerque, Las Cruces, and Santa Fe, respectively; all of them voted for Biden in margins greater than ten points. Aggregate polling correctly showed Biden being up by double-digits in the state.

Per exit polls by the Associated Press, much of Biden's strength in New Mexico came from Latino voters, from whom he garnered 61% of the vote. These included 54% of Latinos of Mexican heritage and 70% of Spanish-Americans. Biden also carried a plurality of Caucasian/white voters in the state (49% to Trump's 48%). He also won over Native Americans, garnering 60–90% of the vote. 53% of voters believed the Trump administration was doing too little to help Native American reservations in New Mexico during the COVID-19 pandemic, and these voters broke for Biden by 75%–23%.

On the other hand, Trump increased his popular vote percentage by 3.46%, earning 43.5% of the vote share and over 400,000 votes in total. Much of this improvement could be attributed to the fact that the Libertarian Party nominee in 2016 had been former New Mexico Governor Gary Johnson, who earned 9.34% of the vote in his home state; Johnson did not run in 2020. That said, Trump's 43.5% represented not only an improvement on his own vote share in 2016, but also on those of future Utah Senator Mitt Romney in 2012 (42.84%) and Arizona Senator John McCain in 2008 (41.78%). This was the first election since 1968 in which New Mexico voted more Republican than neighboring Colorado. Biden became the first Democrat to win the White House without carrying Colfax County since 1912, when New Mexico was granted statehood, or Hidalgo County since 1920, when it was created. This was the first election since 1948 in which Valencia County voted for the losing candidate. Despite New Mexico no longer being classified as a critical swing state, Trump became the first ever Republican incumbent to consecutively lose New Mexico in an election and only the second ever U.S. President after Jimmy Carter to consecutively lose New Mexico in the state's history.

Primary elections
The primary elections were held on June 2, 2020.

Republican primary
Donald Trump ran unopposed in the Republican primary, and thus received all of the state's 22 delegates to the 2020 Republican National Convention.

Democratic primary

Libertarian primary

General election

Final predictions

Polling

Graphical summary

Aggregate polls

Polls

Donald Trump vs. Pete Buttigieg

Donald Trump vs. Bernie Sanders

Donald Trump vs. Elizabeth Warren

Results

By county

By congressional district
Biden won 2 out of 3 congressional districts.

Aftermath
On December 14, 2020, the Trump campaign filed a lawsuit against the New Mexico Secretary of State over the use of ballot drop-boxes for the 2020 presidential election. However, on January 11, 2021, five days after Congress certified the results for Joe Biden, the campaign dropped the lawsuit. Trump attorneys Mark Caruso and Michael Smith cited “events that have transpired since the inception of this lawsuit” in a three-page motion as the reason for dropping the lawsuit. Despite the withdrawal, the motion still allows for revisiting these concerns in the future.

See also
 United States presidential elections in New Mexico
 2020 New Mexico elections
 2020 United States presidential election
 2020 Democratic Party presidential primaries
 2020 Libertarian Party presidential primaries
 2020 Republican Party presidential primaries
 2020 United States elections

Notes

Partisan clients

References

Further reading

External links
 
 
  (state affiliate of the U.S. League of Women Voters)
 

New Mexico
2020
United States presidential